Charles Goadsby Ferris (ca. 1796June 4, 1848) was an American lawyer and politician who served as a U.S. Representative from New York, serving two non-consecutive terms from 1834 to 1835, then again from 1841 to 1843.

Early life
Ferris was born at "The Homestead" in Throggs Neck, a neighborhood in the Bronx.  His father, Edward Ferris, was long an Inspector of Flour in New York and one of the founders of the Tammany Society who made a large fortune, which he left to his children, including Charles and his brother, Floyd T. Ferris, a physician.  His mother was Elizabeth Goadsby (d. 1825), daughter of Sir Thomas Goadsby of England.  His sister, Caroline Adelia Ferris, was married to Captain John W. Richardson.

He received a limited education and then studied law.  In 1816, he received a Master of Arts degree from Columbia University.

Career
After being admitted to the bar, practiced in New York City.  He served as member of the New York City Board of Aldermen in 1832 and 1833.

Tenure in Congress 
Ferris was elected as a Jacksonian to the Twenty-third Congress to fill the vacancy caused by the resignation of Dudley Selden and served from December 1, 1834, to March 3, 1835.  Reportedly, Ferris introduced Napoleon III to Tyler during Napoleon's tour of New York in 1837.

Ferris was elected as a Democrat to the Twenty-seventh Congress serving from March 4, 1841 until March 3, 1843.  He was largely instrumental in securing an appropriation through Congress to build the first telegraph line.

Later career 
After he left Congress, he was appointed as Collector of the Port of New York by President John Tyler but his nomination was rejected by the U.S. Senate and Cornelius P. Van Ness served instead.   In 1845, he was reportedly worth $200,000.

Personal life
Ferris was married to Catherine Youngs. Together, they were the parents of one daughter, named after his only sister:

 Caroline Adelia Ferris, who married Glover Clapham in 1850. After his death, she remarried to Samuel Lewis.

Death 
Ferris died in New York City on June 4, 1848.

References

External links

 FERRIS, Charles Goadsby at the Office of Art & Archives, Office of the Clerk for the U.S. House of Representatives

1796 births
1848 deaths
New York City Council members
People from Throggs Neck, Bronx
Jacksonian members of the United States House of Representatives from New York (state)
19th-century American politicians
Democratic Party members of the United States House of Representatives from New York (state)